Sivakumarin Sabadham is a 2021 Indian Tamil-language musical comedy drama film written and directed by Aadhi of Hiphop Tamizha. It is his second film as writer and director after Meesaya Murukku and he co-produced the film with Sathya Jyothi Films in the banner Indie Rebels. Aadhi also stars as the lead alongside Prankster Rahul in his debut and Madhuri Jain. The film was released on 30 September 2021 to mixed reviews and did average collections.

Plot 
A young man from a weaving family vows to restore it to its past glory by taking on a textile magnate.

Cast 
 Hiphop Tamizha Aadhi as Sivakumar 
 Madhuri Jain as Shruthi
 Elango Kumanan as Varadharajan, Sivakumar's grandfather
 Kimu Gopal as Shruthi's Father
 Adithya Kathir as Kathir
 Prankster Rahul as Murugan
 Parvathy Saran (VJ) as Aishwarya, Murugan's wife
 Ranjana Naachiyar as Aishwarya’s mother
 Devi Abhinaya as Sivakumar's mother
 Rahul Raj as Manoj

Production 
Principal photography began in October 2020, and wrapped in December that year within 65 working days.

Soundtrack 

The film's soundtrack was composed by Hiphop Tamizha, while lyrics written by Hiphop Tamizha, Rokesh and Ko Sesha.

Release 
The film received mixed reviews, praising the soundtrack and the performances but criticized the story and screenplay. The film became an average hit.

Satellite rights were acquired by Star Vijay while Disney+ Hotstar acquired digital rights of this film.

References

External links 
 

Films scored by Hiphop Tamizha
2021 films
Indian comedy films
2020s Tamil-language films
2021 comedy films